Penataran or Panataran is one of the largest Hindu temple ruins complex in East Java, Indonesia. It is located in Penataran, Blitar Regency, roughly 12 km northeast of Blitar, with the closest airport being farther away at Malang. Believed to have been constructed between the 12th century to the 15th century, the temple played a significant role in the Majapahit Kingdom, especially under King Hayam Wuruk. He considered his favorite sanctuary. Penataran dates from the Kediri era. 

Candi Panataran is a Shiva (Siwa) temple. It is notable for including one of the largest Indonesian collection of reliefs showing life stories of Hindu god Vishnu in different avatar. In particular, the temple site include the Rama story in the Javanese version of the epic Ramayana, as well Krishna story as depicted Triguna's Krishnayana epic poem. Comparative studies of reliefs related to Hindu epics at Penataran and Prambanan temple (Yogyakarta) complexes have attracted the attention of archaeologists.

World Heritage status 

This site was added to the UNESCO World Heritage Tentative List on October 19, 1995, in the Cultural category. This temple was identified in Nagarakretagama as Palah temple and reported being visited by King Hayam Wuruk during his royal tour across East Java. The site is being considered to be put on the World Heritage list of sites that have "outstanding universal value" to the world. However, on 2015, the site was pulled out from the tentative list along with 11 other sites.

See also

Angkor Wat
Bali
Hinduism in Indonesia

References 

Majapahit
World Heritage Sites in Indonesia
Blitar
Buildings and structures in East Java
Hindu temples in Indonesia
12th-century Hindu temples
Cultural Properties of Indonesia in East Java
Tourist attractions in East Java